Hart, Fellow’s and Company bank was a private bank established in 1808 with its headquarters on Bridlesmith Gate, Nottingham.

History
It was established on 1 January 1808 as Fellows, Mellor & Hart. The partners were John Fellows, Francis Hart and a Mr Mellor.

From about 1824 the business was styled Hart, Fellows & Co.  In 1865 it was acquired by the English Joint Stock Bank which failed in May 1866. It was restarted as a private partnership by Francis Hart and Alfred-Thomas Fellows as Hart, Fellows & Company.

Between 1884 and 1885 the bank headquarters on Bridlesmith Gate in Nottingham was rebuilt and expanded to designs of the architects Evans and Jolley.

In 1891 it was acquired by Lloyds Bank.

References

Buildings and structures in Nottingham
Banks established in 1808
Defunct banks of the United Kingdom
Companies based in Nottingham
Banks disestablished in 1891
History of Nottingham
British companies established in 1808
1808 establishments in England